C.P DUBB is an American hip-hop, R&B and contemporary music producer from Los Angeles. He is known best for his production on Tyga's "Make It Nasty" and French Montana's "Unforgettable".

Discography

2011 
 E-40 – She Smashed The Homie
 01. "She Smashed The Homie" (Featuring Snoop Dogg and Ray J)
 Ben J
 01. "Tsunami Swagg" (featuring Mann)
 New Boyz – Too Cool To Care
 03. "Active Kingz" (Featuring Tyga)
Casey Veggies – Said She Like Me (Single)
 01. "Said She Like Me" 
 Casey Veggies – Sleeping in Class
 15. "Can I Live" (Featuring Mac Miller)
 Tyga – #BitchImTheShit
 03. "Make It Nasty"

2012 
 Tyga – Careless World: Rise of the Last King
 23. "Make It Nasty"
 Honey Cocaine – #F*ckYoFeelings
 02. "Yo Own Thang"
 04. "Waiting Outside"
 12. "'Bout It"
 15. "Yellow B*tch"
 Audio Push – Truth Be Told
 16. "Shake It Up" (Featuring Iamsu) 
 New Boyz – Foolie Tape
 02. "Rain Dance" (Featuring Cory Gunz)
 05. "Starters"

2013 
 Soulja Boy – 23
 01. "Intro"
02. "She Got Swag"
04. "WTF"
 Tyga – Well Done IV
 10. "The Letter" (featuring Esty) (co-produced by J Holt)

2014 
 Legacy – Dolo x II
 01. "Remember These Days"
 06. "Schemin" (co-produced by J Holt)

2015 
 Kid Ink – Full Speed
 06. "Cool Back"
 Honey Cocaine –
 "Sundae" (The Gift Rap)

References

External links

Living people
Year of birth missing (living people)
People from Los Angeles
Record producers from California